The Taiwan Railway EMU400 was an electric train purchased by Taiwan Railway from South Africa in 1990  and is the first-generation of commuter electric train for Taiwan Railways. A total of 48 vehicles in 12 groups have been introduced, which have been put into commuter train services between Hsinchu and Keelung since the beginning of operation, replacing the non-air-conditioned commuter buses formerly used along the route. Due to the introduction of EMU800 series electric trains, all EM400 units have been withdrawn from service in 2015.

History of introduction
When the EMU400 was introduced in 1990, the typical express train used for commuter service with Taiwan Railways were simple express units without air-conditioning, despite the somewhat widespread railway electrification at the time and the Edmondson railway ticket system was still used. In order to cooperate with Taiwan Railway MRT and improve ride comfort, plans were made to introduce an electric EMU train as a replacement for the diesel express train that ran between Keelung and northern Hsinchu. The EMU 400 had a demonstration run on November 9, 1990 with an invitation to the general public to ride train, before opening for official service the next day. In November 2006, a new type of local train was launched and the fare system used on the Fu-Hsing Semi-Express was adopted.

Technical specifications and construction details

Overview
An EMU 400 trainset was composed of groups of 4 cars, the EM cars (driving motor cars), the EP cars (electric cars), the ET cars (trailers) and the EMC cars (driving motor cars, with a driver’s cabin); up to 4 groups of 16 vehicles can be connected in operation.  The traction motors were installed in the EM cars and EMC cars, the pantograph was located on the EP cars, and generators were installed in the ET cars. In addition, ET cars were added to the train, so that the previous EMU200 and EMU300 three-car grouping method was changed to a group of four, with the same design extended to EMU500, EMU600 and subsequent models.

Appearance
The train’s initial livery had it painted in ultramarine blue (F09, Ultramarine, NCS color code 3355-R80B) and cloud white (G80, Cloud white, NCS color code 0704-G38Y) according to the South African national standard SANS 1091. The Taiwan Railway Administration emblem, car number and other identifiers also use ultramarine blue.  The lower edge on both sides of the car body is designed to be curved inward, which is a feature of this model. The original design of each car body has 3 doors on each side, but the final design adopted has only 2 doors on each side,  located close to the center of the carriage, with the design of the automatic door and the station display on each carriage to be a black background with white characters, the first to be seen on Taiwan Railway equipment.  After several overhauls of the train, the ultramarine livery was gradually changed to today's dark blue, and the station display board was changed to a red LED. In 2010, in conjunction with a platform height enhancement project, the train also saw renovation of the steps in the door openings, the last modification to the train.

Interior
When the train was introduced, it used grab handles of a similar design to those used on the Taipai City bus in the 1990s. The interior had olive green fabric seat fabric and a black floor. At a later date, the grab handles were changed to be the same as those used in the EMU500 trains with a change of fabric on the seats. The fabric was replaced with the same dark green one used in the EMU500, and the floor was changed to a green pattern, similar to that used in the EMU500, but with a darker colour. The cars also have floor columns near the doors and ceiling grab bars to accommodate a larger number of passengers.  The center of the ceiling is equipped with a square grid pattern pointing in the direction of the operator, where the loudspeaker and the air conditioning’s return outlet are hidden. The air conditioning outlet is slightly widened, which is a unique feature of this type of car. The through-door between the carriages is a double-fold sliding door, which is the only model of Taiwan Railway equipment to adopt this design.

Retirement
After the EMU400 trains were removed from service in October 2015, some were parked in the Taiwan Railway's Qidu Yard. A few units were discovered to have been covered in graffiti. A railway official said the matter had been reported to the police.

References 

 Electric multiple units of Taiwan
Train-related introductions in 1990
Taiwan Railways Administration
25 kV AC multiple units